The Martinez Brothers are a duo of disc jockeys, music producers, and remixers from The Bronx, New York known for their long-term residencies at clubs in Ibiza. In 2014 they were named as DJs of the year by Mixmag, who wrote that "no other DJ or DJ duo encapsulates house music in 2014 like the crown princes of DC10."

History

Early years and founding
The Martinez Brothers are a house DJ/producer duo born and raised in the New York borough known as the Bronx.  Steven and Chris Martinez were introduced to music from a young age, when their father took it upon himself to provide a musical upbringing, involving the boys in the church band. There they would collaborate with much older musicians, performing genres as diverse as disco, soul, and salsa. Their father eventually brought them their first set of DJ equipment, encouraging their interest in pursuing dance music as a career, and remaining supportive ever since.

Early club residencies
As the brothers grew older, and continued to work on their music production, they were increasingly exposed to New York's dance music scene. After hearing their sets, DJ Dennis Ferrer began mentoring the duo, helping them branch out through his contacts and helping them book gigs at a number of notable New York venues. Dennis also signed them to his record label Objektivity.

In 2011 they were invited to Ibiza, Spain for their first DJ residency, where they were to begin spinning at the club Ushuaïa alongside their former tutor Dennis Ferrer. However this arrangement fell through at the last minute, and they instead approached friend and DC-10 booker, Elliot Shaw, who managed to secure a last-minute residency for the brothers. They have held regular residencies at the Ibizan club ever since.

Recent projects

As of 2014 The Martinez Brothers have maintained a busy international touring schedule. Featuring many performances on behalf of their collaborative label Tuskegee Records alongside co-label owner Seth Troxler. Tuskegee doubles up as a music and fashion label.

In 2014 they worked directly with high end fashion designer Riccardo Tisci to create the soundtrack for Givenchy’s menswear and women’s wear fall/winter 2014 and spring 2015 collections. They have also launched their own label, Cuttin’ Headz. Showcasing both their own music and productions from other artists. In 2014 they were named as DJs of the year by UK dance music publication Mixmag, and as a result were placed on the front cover for the December edition of the print magazine. Mixmag wrote that "no other DJ or DJ duo encapsulates house music in 2014 like the crown princes of DC10."

Also in 2014 they were the only non-Chic cohorts to be invited by Nile Rodgers to contribute on his upcoming album It’s About Time. The Martinez Brothers added percussion on the lead single "I’ll Be There." In May 2015, they released their free EP Masters At Dutch.

Touring
Beyond their club residencies and performances at nightclubs such as Club Space in Miami, the duo maintains an active international touring schedule. In 2009 they performed at Electric Daisy Carnival in California to a crowd of approximately 60,000 attendees. They performed at the Detroit Electronic Music Festival for DEMF 2010 and later at DEMF 2014. In 2011 they performed at Electric Zoo Festival in Randall's Island in New York City, and the IndepenDANCE Pool Party in Miami.
In 2012 they performed at Rock in Rio Lisboa V, as a headlining act at the Eletrónica Heineken stage. In 2014 they performed at festivals such as Lovebox and Creamfields in England, as well as Escapade Music Festival in Canada. They also performed at The BPM Festival held in Mexico in 2015 and at Tomorrowland in Belgium during the summer.

Members
Chris Martinez (2007–present) - deejaying
Steven Martinez (2007–present) - deejaying

Awards and rankings

Discography

DJ mixes

Extended plays

Singles

Further reading
Interviews and articles

 
Discographies
The Martinez Brothers at AllMusic
The Martinez Brothers at Discogs

See also
Seth Troxler
List of house music artists

References

External links

The Martinez Brothers on Facebook
The Martinez Brothers on Twitter 
The Martinez Brothers on SoundCloud

American electronic music groups
Musical groups from the Bronx
American dance music groups
Remixers
Musicians from the Bronx